Grimstone or Grimston is a hamlet and civil parish in the Ryedale district of North Yorkshire, England. It lies beside the main B1363 road between York and Helmsley. Grimston lies in the Howardian Hills just south of the North York Moors National Park and close to Ampleforth Abbey and College. In 2015 it had an estimated population of 60.

Grimston is small, and is made up of around 14 households. Historically, it originates from an old manorial estate  , and several of the buildings still hold related names: Grimston Manor, Grimston Manor Farm, Grimston Lodge, Grimston Cottage and Grimston Grange. Grimston was recorded in the Domesday Book as Grimeston.

References 

Villages in North Yorkshire
Civil parishes in North Yorkshire
Ryedale